Fu Huan (born 12 July 1993 in Shanghai) is a Chinese football player who currently plays for Chinese Super League side Shanghai SIPG as a right-back.

Club career
Born in Shanghai, Fu joined Genbao Football Academy in July 2005. He was promoted to academy's first team Shanghai East Asia squad in 2011. On 15 October 2011, he made his senior debut in a 0–0 league draw against Beijing Institute of Technology, coming on as a substitute for Zhan Yilin in the 58th minute. On 2 June 2012, Fu scored his first goal for Shanghai East Asia in the second round of 2012 Chinese FA Cup which Shanghai beat Fujian Smart Hero 6–0. He made 6 league appearances in the 2012 season, as Shanghai East Asia won the champions and promotion to the top flight. Fu scored his first Super League goal on 19 August 2016 in a 4–1 home victory against Shijiazhuang Ever Bright. He would go on to establish himself as a tough tackling confrontational player, which saw him sent off during a league match with Guangzhou R&F when he was involved in a collision with Li Tixiang on 18 June 2017. He would receive a ban of 6 matches by the Chinese Football Association for his subsequent abrasive behaviour. On his return his combative behaviour would go on to help the club win the 2018 Chinese Super League title.

With the introduction of Ivan Leko as Head coach, Fu would see his playing time significantly reduce after he preferred using Wang Shenchao as right-back, which saw him go on loan to second tier club Kunshan on 27 August 2022. He would make his first appearance for the club on 29 August 2022 against Qingdao Youth Island in a 1-0 victory. He would go on to establish himself as regular within the team that won the division and promotion to the top tier at the end of the 2022 China League One campaign.

International career
On 10 Nov 2017, Fu made his debut for the Chinese national team in a 2–0 loss against Serbia

Career statistics

Club statistics 
Statistics accurate as of match played 25 December 2022.

International statistics

Honours

Club
Shanghai SIPG
Chinese Super League: 2018
China League One: 2012
Chinese FA Super Cup: 2019

Kunshan
China League One: 2022

References

External links
 
 

1993 births
Living people
Chinese footballers
Footballers from Shanghai
China international footballers
Shanghai Port F.C. players
Association football defenders
Chinese Super League players
China League One players
Footballers at the 2014 Asian Games
Asian Games competitors for China